The Air Tractor-L3Harris OA-1K Sky Warden (company designation AT-802U) is an American fixed-wing, single-engine Light Attack/Armed Reconnaissance aircraft built by Air Tractor and L3Harris for the Armed Overwatch program of the United States Special Operations Command (SOCOM). It was developed from the Air Tractor AT-802, an American aircraft often used for agricultural purposes. The AT-802U Sky Warden won the Armed Overwatch trial, and on 1 August 2022, the United States Special Operations Command announced a US$3 billion contract to purchase 75 aircraft by 2029.

Design and development
The AT-802U Sky Warden was developed from the Air Tractor AT-802, for the Special Operations Command's Armed Overwatch trial. A version of the AT-802 has been used for years eradicating coca leaf crops (used in the production of illicit drugs) and as a result was already outfitted with lightweight composite ballistic armored engine compartment and cockpit, called a "bathtub." The windshield features flat ballistic glass panels. The cockpit is built of a steel tube frame design to act as a roll cage, and can support the entire weight of the aircraft. The aircraft is not designed to fit ejection seats. The fuel lines and fuel tank are self-sealing and features emergency fuel jettison. Restraints include a 5-point harness equipped with airbags. Essential flight controls are present in both the front and rear seats. The landing gear configuration differs from most modern aircraft in that it is a tail-wheel configuration, which is optimal for austere and unimproved airstrip landings.

The AT-802U is designed for expedient deployment and can be disassembled within a day to fit inside a single C-17 cargo aircraft. It can then be reassembled to mission-ready status within a single day.

On 1 August 2022 Air Tractor and L3Harris were awarded a US$3 billion contract for 75 aircraft. The contract included an upfront payment of US$170 million, with the rest being paid out as the fleet is delivered. The aircraft is built in two stages; the airframe is built by Air Tractor in Olney, Texas, and the armor and weapons systems are added by L3Harris in Tulsa, Oklahoma. It will replace the U-28A Draco, often used for anti-insurgency operations.

The AT-802U was officially designated the OA-1K in late 2022.

Operators

 United States Air Force
 Air Force Special Operations Command (AFSOC)

Specifications (AT-802U)

References

External links

 Air Tractor AT-802U website
 L3Harris Sky Warden website

2020s United States attack aircraft